Noncommutative algebraic geometry is a branch of mathematics, and more specifically a direction in noncommutative geometry, that studies the geometric properties of formal duals of non-commutative algebraic objects such as rings as well as geometric objects derived from them (e.g. by gluing along localizations or taking noncommutative stack quotients).

For example, noncommutative algebraic geometry is supposed to extend a notion of an algebraic scheme by suitable gluing of spectra of noncommutative rings; depending on how literally and how generally this aim (and a notion of spectrum) is understood in noncommutative setting, this has been achieved in various level of success. The noncommutative ring generalizes here a commutative ring of regular functions on a commutative scheme. Functions on usual spaces in the traditional (commutative) algebraic geometry have a product defined by pointwise multiplication; as the values of these functions commute, the functions also commute: a times b equals b times a. It is remarkable that viewing noncommutative associative algebras as algebras of functions on "noncommutative" would-be space is a far-reaching geometric intuition, though it formally looks like a fallacy.

Much of the motivation for noncommutative geometry, and in particular for the noncommutative algebraic geometry, is from physics; especially from quantum physics, where the algebras of observables are indeed viewed as noncommutative analogues of functions, hence having the ability to observe their geometric aspects is desirable.

One of the values of the field is that it also provides new techniques to study objects in commutative algebraic geometry such as Brauer groups.

The methods of noncommutative algebraic geometry are analogs of the methods of commutative algebraic geometry, but frequently the foundations are different. Local behavior in commutative algebraic geometry is captured by commutative algebra and especially the study of local rings. These do not have a ring-theoretic analogue in the noncommutative setting; though in a categorical setup one can talk about stacks of local categories of quasicoherent sheaves over noncommutative spectra. Global properties such as those arising from homological algebra and K-theory more frequently carry over to the noncommutative setting.

History

Classical approach: the issue of non-commutative localization 
Commutative algebraic geometry begins by constructing the spectrum of a ring. The points of the algebraic variety (or more generally, scheme) are the prime ideals of the ring, and the functions on the algebraic variety are the elements of the ring. A noncommutative ring, however, may not have any proper non-zero two-sided prime ideals. For instance, this is true of the Weyl algebra of polynomial differential operators on affine space: The Weyl algebra is a simple ring. Therefore, one can for instance attempt to replace a prime spectrum by a primitive spectrum: there are also the theory of non-commutative localization as well as descent theory. This works to some extent: for instance, Dixmier's enveloping algebras may be thought of as working out non-commutative algebraic geometry for the primitive spectrum of an enveloping algebra of a Lie algebra. Another work in a similar spirit is Michael Artin’s notes titled “noncommutative rings”, which in part is an attempt to study representation theory from a non-commutative-geometry point of view. The key insight to both approaches is that irreducible representations, or at least primitive ideals, can be thought of as “non-commutative points”.

Modern viewpoint using categories of sheaves 
As it turned out, starting from, say, primitive spectra, it was not easy to develop a workable sheaf theory. One might imagine this difficulty is because of a sort of quantum phenomenon: points in a space can influence points far away (and in fact, it is not appropriate to treat points individually and view a space as a mere collection of the points).

Due to the above, one accepts a paradigm implicit in Pierre Gabriel's thesis and partly justified by the Gabriel–Rosenberg reconstruction theorem (after Pierre Gabriel and Alexander L. Rosenberg) that a commutative scheme can be reconstructed, up to isomorphism of schemes, solely from the abelian category of quasicoherent sheaves on the scheme. Alexander Grothendieck taught that to do geometry one does not need a space, it is enough to have a category of sheaves on that would be space; this idea has been transmitted to noncommutative algebra by Yuri Manin. There are, a bit weaker, reconstruction theorems from the derived categories of (quasi)coherent sheaves motivating the derived noncommutative algebraic geometry (see just below).

Derived algebraic geometry 

Perhaps the most recent approach is through the deformation theory, placing non-commutative algebraic geometry in the realm of derived algebraic geometry.

As a motivating example, consider the one-dimensional Weyl algebra over the complex numbers C. This is the quotient of the free ring C<x, y> by the relation
xy - yx = 1.
This ring represents the polynomial differential operators in a single variable x; y stands in for the differential operator ∂x. This ring fits into a one-parameter family given by the relations . When α is not zero, then this relation determines a ring isomorphic to the Weyl algebra. When α is zero, however, the relation is the commutativity relation for x and y, and the resulting quotient ring is the polynomial ring in two variables, C[x, y]. Geometrically, the polynomial ring in two variables represents the two-dimensional affine space A2, so the existence of this one-parameter family says that affine space admits non-commutative deformations to the space determined by the Weyl algebra. This deformation is related to the symbol of a differential operator and that A2 is the cotangent bundle of the affine line. (Studying the Weyl algebra can lead to information about affine space: The Dixmier conjecture about the Weyl algebra is equivalent to the Jacobian conjecture about affine space.)

Proj of a noncommutative ring 

One of the basic constructions in commutative algebraic geometry is the Proj construction of a graded commutative ring. This construction builds a projective algebraic variety together with a very ample line bundle whose homogeneous coordinate ring is the original ring. Building the underlying topological space of the variety requires localizing the ring, but building sheaves on that space does not. By a theorem of Jean-Pierre Serre, quasi-coherent sheaves on Proj of a graded ring are the same as graded modules over the ring up to finite dimensional factors. The philosophy of topos theory promoted by Alexander Grothendieck says that the category of sheaves on a space can serve as the space itself.  Consequently, in non-commutative algebraic geometry one often defines Proj in the following fashion: Let R be a graded C-algebra, and let Mod-R denote the category of graded right R-modules. Let F denote the subcategory of Mod-R consisting of all modules of finite length. Proj R is defined to be the quotient of the abelian category Mod-R by F. Equivalently, it is a localization of Mod-R in which two modules become isomorphic if, after taking their direct sums with appropriately chosen objects of F, they are isomorphic in Mod-R.

This approach leads to a theory of non-commutative projective geometry. A non-commutative smooth projective curve turns out to be a smooth commutative curve, but for singular curves or smooth higher-dimensional spaces, the non-commutative setting allows new objects.

See also 
Derived noncommutative algebraic geometry
Q-category
quasi-free algebra

Notes

References 
 M. Artin, J. J. Zhang, Noncommutative projective schemes, Advances in Mathematics 109 (1994), no. 2, 228–287, doi.
 Yuri I. Manin, Quantum groups and non-commutative geometry, CRM, Montreal 1988.
 Yuri I Manin, Topics in noncommutative geometry, 176 pp. Princeton 1991.
 A. Bondal, M. van den Bergh, Generators and representability of functors in commutative and noncommutative geometry, Moscow Mathematical Journal 3 (2003), no. 1, 1–36.
 A. Bondal, D. Orlov, Reconstruction of a variety from the derived category and groups of autoequivalences, Compositio Mathematica 125 (2001), 327–344 doi
 John Francis, Derived Algebraic Geometry Over -Rings
 O. A. Laudal, Noncommutative algebraic geometry, Rev. Mat. Iberoamericana 19, n. 2 (2003), 509--580; euclid.
 Fred Van Oystaeyen, Alain Verschoren, Non-commutative algebraic geometry, Springer Lect. Notes in Math. 887, 1981.
 Fred van Oystaeyen, Algebraic geometry for associative algebras, Marcel Dekker 2000. vi+287 pp.
 A. L.  Rosenberg, Noncommutative algebraic geometry and representations of quantized algebras, MIA 330, Kluwer Academic Publishers Group, Dordrecht, 1995. xii+315 pp. 
 M. Kontsevich, A. Rosenberg, Noncommutative smooth spaces,  The Gelfand Mathematical Seminars, 1996--1999,  85--108, Gelfand Math. Sem., Birkhäuser, Boston 2000; arXiv:math/9812158
 A. L. Rosenberg, Noncommutative schemes, Compositio Mathematica 112 (1998) 93--125, doi; Underlying spaces of noncommutative schemes, preprint MPIM2003-111, dvi, ps; MSRI lecture Noncommutative schemes and spaces (Feb 2000): video
 Pierre Gabriel, Des catégories abéliennes, Bulletin de la Société Mathématique de France 90 (1962), p. 323-448, numdam
 Zoran Škoda, Some equivariant constructions in noncommutative algebraic geometry, Georgian Mathematical Journal 16 (2009), No. 1, 183--202, arXiv:0811.4770.
 Dmitri Orlov, Quasi-coherent sheaves in commutative and non-commutative geometry, Izv. RAN. Ser. Mat., 2003,  vol. 67, issue 3, 119–138 (MPI preprint version dvi, ps)
 M. Kapranov, Noncommutative geometry based on commutator expansions, Journal für die reine und angewandte Mathematik 505 (1998), 73-118, math.AG/9802041.

Further reading 
 A. Bondal, D. Orlov, Semi-orthogonal decomposition for algebraic varieties_, PreprintMPI/95–15, alg-geom/9506006
 Tomasz Maszczyk, Noncommutative geometry through monoidal categories, math.QA/0611806
 S. Mahanta, On some approaches towards non-commutative algebraic geometry, math.QA/0501166
 Ludmil Katzarkov, Maxim Kontsevich, Tony Pantev, Hodge theoretic aspects of mirror symmetry, arxiv/0806.0107
 Dmitri Kaledin, Tokyo lectures "Homological methods in non-commutative geometry", pdf, TeX; and (similar but different) Seoul lectures

External links 
 MathOverflow, Theories of Noncommutative Geometry
 
 
 
 

Algebraic geometry
Noncommutative geometry